North Savo (or Northern Savonia;) is a region in eastern Finland. It borders the regions of South Savo, Central Finland, North Ostrobothnia, Kainuu, and North Karelia. Kuopio is the largest city in the region and Lake Kallavesi is the largest lake in the region.

The region's traditional food is a fish and bacon filling pie called Kalakukko.

Historical provinces 
For history, geography and culture see: Savonia

Municipalities 

North Savo includes 19 municipalities, which five of them are cities and towns (marked bold).

 Iisalmi (Idensalmi)
Population: 
 Joroinen (Jorois)
Population: 
 Kaavi
Population: 
 Keitele
Population: 
 Kiuruvesi
Population: 
 Kuopio
Population: 
 Lapinlahti
Population: 
 Leppävirta
Population: 
 Pielavesi
Population: 
 Rautalampi
Population: 

 Rautavaara
Population: 
 Siilinjärvi
Population: 
 Sonkajärvi
Population: 
 Suonenjoki
Population: 
 Tervo
Population: 
 Tuusniemi
Population: 
 Varkaus
Population: 
 Vesanto
Population: 
 Vieremä
Population: 

Also, North Savo includes five sub-regions: Kuopio sub-region, Inner Savonia, North Eastern Savonia, Upper Savonia, and Varkaus sub-region.

Politics 
Results of the 2019 Finnish parliamentary election in North Savo:

Centre Party  21.67%
Finns Party  17.55%
National Coalition Party  14.80%
Social Democratic Party  14.57%
Green League  9.46%
Christian Democrats  8.61%
Left Alliance  8.44%
Movement Now   1.93%
Blue Reform   1.62%
Seven Star Movement   0.44%
Other parties   0.91%

Tertiary education 
 University of Eastern Finland, Kuopio Campus (enrollment c. 6,000, in Kuopio)
 Savonia University of Applied Sciences (enrollment c. 6,000, in Kuopio (about 4,500), Varkaus and Iisalmi)
 Kuopio department of Sibelius Academy (c. 150 studying for Master of Music in Church music or Master of Arts in Arts Management)
 Kuopio department of Humak University of Applied Sciences (c. 100  studying to be Sign language Interpreters)

References

External links 

 Official Regional Council of Northern Savonia website

 
Eastern Finland Province
Savo, North